The 1895 Atlantic hurricane season ran through the summer and the first half of fall in 1895. The season was a fairly inactive one, with six storms forming, only two of which became hurricanes.



Timeline

Systems

Tropical Storm One 

The first storm formed on August 14 and lasted until August 17. It formed in the Gulf of Mexico and moved north, making landfall in Alabama.

Hurricane Two 

The second storm formed on August 22 and lasted until August 29. It formed directly to the east of the Lesser Antilles and scraped the Yucatán Peninsula but did not hit it, and made landfall in the southernmost part of Texas.

Tropical Storm Three 

The third storm formed on September 28 and lasted until October 7. It formed right on the east of the Yucatán Peninsula. It hit the Yucatán then curved over and under Florida, then went through the Bahamas. Its maximum sustained winds were at 55 mph (89 km/h). This storm was responsible for an estimated 56 deaths.

Tropical Storm Four 

The fourth tropical storm probably formed on October 2 in the western Caribbean Sea. It apparently crossed the Yucatán Peninsula on October 4, just a few days after Three struck the same area. This cyclone moved into Texas and Louisiana on October 7, producing breezy conditions and some rain.

Hurricane Five 

The fifth storm formed on October 12 and lasted until October 26. It formed to the east of the southern Lesser Antilles and Windward Islands as a tropical storm. After passing through the Windwards, it reached hurricane status and eventually strengthened to a Category 2 as it moved westward through the southern Caribbean Sea. Some lives were reportedly lost in Cuba.

Tropical Storm Six 

The final storm formed on October 13 and lasted until October 17. The storm was fairly short-lived and mostly maintained its peak intensity as a minimal  tropical storm, forming in the Bay of Campeche and curving east-northeast past the tip of the Yucatán Peninsula and making landfall in southwest Florida. It weakened to a depression after moving inland and crossing the southern half of the state, finally dissipating off the southeast Florida coast near the Bahamas.

See also 

 List of tropical cyclones
 Atlantic hurricane season

References

External links 
 Monthly Weather Review

 
1895 natural disasters
1895 meteorology